The Pennsylvania budget impasse is a series of budget impasses or fiscal crises, the latest of which is happening during negotiations of the 2017-2018 state budget.  In a budget impasse, the state government cannot pass a budget through the General Assembly and so the Commonwealth cannot pay its bills or payrolls. 
Update as of March 23,2016 the budget impasse for this fiscal year is over.
UPDATE AS of 10/5/2017 the budget impasse for this fiscal year is ongoing. 

Sources

http://www.pa.gov/Pages/budgetFAQs.aspx#.VvMX-Zj3aJI

http://www.philly.com/philly/news/20160324_Wolf_relents_on_budget__ends_historic_impasse.html

Background

The Pennsylvania Constitution requires the adoption of a budget by midnight June 30 each year, the last day in the fiscal year. There were seven consecutive budget impasses in Pennsylvania between 2003 and 2009, with tensions between Democratic Governor Ed Rendell and the Republican-controlled State Senate delaying the passage of annual budgets. While the trend was broken for several years after 2009, conflicts between the Legislature and the Governor led to subsequent budget impasses in 2014 and 2015.

Past budget impasses

2007
In 2007, state employees who were considered non-essential were furloughed for one day during that year's budget impasse.

2008
In 2008, three state employee unions (AFSCME, SEIU Local 668 and FOSCEP) sought a declaration from the Supreme Court of Pennsylvania that "the Governor's furlough plan is not "legally required" by Article III, Section 24 of the Pennsylvania Constitution and the FLSA, as the Governor's Office has asserted in public statements."   The Governor, Ed Rendell, and the then-Treasurer, Robin Wiessmann, filed a cross-application for summary relief, asking the Court to indicate that paying state employees outside the budget is not allowed by state law.

2009
In 2009, the state had a $3.2 billion deficit.  Twenty-four year term State Rep. Edward G. Staback has stated that, "It is probably the worst I have ever seen."  Governor Rendell proposed an increase of 16% in the state's personal income tax to balance the budget.  Republican lawmakers and some Democrats have insisted on there being no new taxes in 2009.

This disagreement over the state's budget has created this year's budget impasse. Instead of implementing furloughs like previous years, all Pennsylvania state employees are required to continue working through the budget impasse. The majority of these employees will not be paid until after the new budget is adopted.

During the impasse, 16,000 state workers took advantage of low interest loans to provide for expenses while they were without paychecks.

2014
The first and only budget impasse that occurred during the Tom Corbett administration took place during the negotiations over the 2014-2015 state budget. The fiscal year elapsed without a signed budget, as Corbett withheld his signature from a $29.1 billion budget passed by the Republican-controlled legislature, citing the absence of pension reform. The impasse ended on July 10, when Corbett ultimately signed the Legislature's budget proposal, which continued to lack pension reform. When signing the budget, the Governor used his line item veto power to cut $65 million, or 20 percent, of the Legislature's operating budget, a move that drew criticism from state lawmakers.

2015

Wolf Vetoed the entire budget in June.  88 days later he vetoes the stop gap measures passed by the Republican Legislature.

As of December 29, 2015, a budget was passed. The budget is a stop gap measure and the governor vetoed $6.8 billion in spending.

References

External links
 Pennsylvania Government Site

2000s economic history
2010s economic history
Great Recession in the United States
History of Pennsylvania
Government of Pennsylvania
Economy of Pennsylvania